Deh Gharati (also Romanized as Deh Ghāratī; also known as Gharati) is a village in Kushk Rural District, Abezhdan District, Andika County, Khuzestan Province, Iran. At the 2006 census, its population was 59, in 10 families.

References 

Populated places in Andika County